Zabrus ganglbaueri is a species ground beetle in the Pterostichinae subfamily that can be found in Albania (Merdita) and North Macedonia.

Subspecies
There are two subspecies of Z. ganglbaueri:
 Z. ganglbaueri ganglbaueri Apfelbeck, 1906
 Z. ganglbaueri lonae J. Muller, 1923

References

Beetles described in 1906
Beetles of Europe